Clearwater Township may refer to the following places in the United States:

 Clearwater Township, Michigan
 Clearwater Township, Minnesota
 Clearwater Township, Nebraska

Township name disambiguation pages